Qurdbayram (also, Qurd Bayram, Kürdbayram, and Kyurd-Bayram) is a village and municipality in the Kurdamir Rayon of Azerbaijan.

References 

Populated places in Kurdamir District